Gabriela Braga Guimarães, nickname Gabi, (born 19 May 1994) is a Brazilian indoor volleyball player. She plays as an outside spiker. She competed at the 2020 Summer Olympics, in the Women's tournament, winning a silver medal.

Career
Guimarães played with her national team, winning the bronze at the 2014 World Championship when her team defeated Italy 3–2 in the bronze medal match.

During the 2015 FIVB Club World Championship, Guimarães played with the Brazilian club Rexona Ades Rio and her team lost the bronze medal match to the Swiss Voléro Zürich. She helped her national team to win the 2015 South American Championship gold medal and she was also awarded Most Valuable Player and Best Outside Hitter.

She led her national team as captain to the 2022 FIVB Volleyball Women's Nations League where they won the silver medal.

Awards

Individuals
 2010 Youth South American Championship – "Best Spiker"
 2011 FIVB U18 World Championship – "Best Scorer"
 2013 South American Club Championship – "Best Spiker"
 2013 FIVB U20 World Championship – "Best Outside Spiker"
 2015 South American Championship – "Most Valuable Player"
 2015 South American Championship – "Best Outside Spiker"
 2014–15 Brazilian Superliga – "Best Spiker"
 2014–15 Brazilian Superliga – "Best Scorer"
 2017 South American Club Championship – "Most Valuable Player"
 2017 FIVB Club World Championship – "Best Outside Spiker"
 2018 FIVB Club World Championship – "Best Outside Spiker"
 2019 South American Club Championship – "Best Outside Spiker"
 2018–19 Brazilian Superliga – "Best Outside Spiker"
 2019 FIVB Nations League – "Best Outside Spiker"
 2021 FIVB Nations League – "Best Outside Spiker"
 2021 South American Championship – "Most Valuable Player"
 2021 FIVB Club World Championship – "Best Outside Spiker"
 2021–22 CEV Champions League – "Most Valuable Player"
 2022 FIVB Nations League – "Best Outside Spiker"
 2022 FIVB World Championship – "Best Outside Hitter"
 2022 FIVB Club World Championships - "Best Outside Spiker"

Clubs
 2012–13 Brazilian Superliga –  Champion, with Unilever Vôlei
 2013–14 Brazilian Superliga –  Champion, with Rexona-Ades
 2014–15 Brazilian Superliga –  Champion, with Rexona-Ades
 2015–16 Brazilian Superliga –  Champion, with Rexona-Ades
 2016–17 Brazilian Superliga –  Champion, with Rexona-SESC
 2017–18 Brazilian Superliga –  Runner-Up, with SESC Rio
 2018–19 Brazilian Superliga –  Champion, with Itambé Minas
 2013 South American Club Championship –  Champion, with Unilever Vôlei
 2015 South American Club Championship –  Champion, with Rexona-Ades
 2016 South American Club Championship –  Champion, with Rexona-Ades
 2017 South American Club Championship –  Champion, with Rexona-SESC
 2018 South American Club Championship –  Runner-Up, with SESC Rio
 2019 South American Club Championship –  Champion, with Itambé Minas
 2013 FIVB Club World Championship –  Runner-Up, with Rexona-Ades
 2017 FIVB Club World Championship –  Runner-Up, with Rexona-SESC
 2018 FIVB Club World Championship –  Runner-Up, with Itambé Minas
 2019 FIVB Club World Championship –  Bronze medal, with Vakıfbank S.K.
 2020 Turkish Super Cup -  Runner-Up, with VakıfBank S.K.
 2021 Turkish Super Cup -  Champion, with VakıfBank S.K.
 2020-2021 Turkish Women's Volleyball League -  Champion, with VakıfBank S.K.
 2021 FIVB Club World Championship –  Champion, with VakıfBank S.K.
 2021–22 CEV Women's Champions League –  Champion, with Vakıfbank S.K.
 2022 FIVB Volleyball Women's Club World Championship -  Runner-Up, with VakıfBank S.K.

References

External links
 
 
 

1994 births
Living people
Brazilian women's volleyball players
Sportspeople from Belo Horizonte
Volleyball players at the 2016 Summer Olympics
Olympic volleyball players of Brazil
Outside hitters
Volleyball players at the 2020 Summer Olympics
Medalists at the 2020 Summer Olympics
Olympic medalists in volleyball
Olympic silver medalists for Brazil
VakıfBank S.K. volleyballers
Expatriate volleyball players in Turkey